Gencay is a Turkish given name. Notable people with the name include:

Gencay Gürün (born 1932), Turkish female art director, diplomat, and politician
Gencay Kasapçı (1933–2017), Turkish painter

See also
Gençay (surname)

Turkish given names